Thanon Tok is a road junction in the Bang Kho Laem Subdistrict, Bang Kho Laem District, Bangkok. It is a crossroad of Charoen Krung, Rama III and Mahaisawan Roads, with considered as the last intersection of Charoen Krung.

The name "Thanon Tok" means "road to fall", because it's the end of Charoen Krung Road straight to south and ends at the Chao Phraya River. Hence colloquially referred to as "Thanon Tok" according its characteristics. Originally, it was a main port of Bangkok named "Thanon Tok Pier" before the establishment of Bangkok Port, also was a location of Bangkok Dock Company. Subsequently, when water transportation and water trading were reduced in importance and Bangkok Port moved to present Khlong Toei, it became a freight-only pier.

Government facilities in the area include Charoenkrung Pracharak Hospital, a public hospital under the Bangkok Metropolitan Administration (BMA) and the Yan Nawa office of the Metropolitan Electricity Authority (MEA), where one of Bangkok's former trams is preserved as a tourist attraction. The Bang Kho Laem Line of the Bangkok trams terminated here at Thanon Tok.

Bangkok Mass Transit Authority (BMTA) bus line 1 is the only route that runs all the length of Charoen Krung from Thanon Tok to Tha Tian in Phra Nakhon District, the distance is 12 kilometers (about 7 mi).

At the southern end of Charoen Krung Road from Trok Chan as far as Thanon Tok considered as a large community of Muslims. Thus making it the location of many mosques i.e. Masjid Darul Abideen, Masjid Al Bayaan, Masjid Bang Uthit, Masjid Assalafiyah etc. These Muslim ancestors all migrated from Java or Malay since the reign of King Rama I in the early Rattanakosin (18th century).

References 

Streets in Bangkok
Bang Kho Laem district
Road junctions in Bangkok
Populated places on the Chao Phraya River
Neighbourhoods of Bangkok